Markquis Morris Nowell (born December 25, 1999) is an American college basketball player for the Kansas State Wildcats of the Big 12 Conference. He previously played for the Little Rock Trojans.

High school career
Nowell began his high school career at The legendary basketball powerhouse, St. Anthony High School in Jersey City, NJ under Hall Of Fame Coach Bob Hurley Sr. After receiving minimum playing time after his freshman year he decided to transfer schools to Bishop Loughlin Memorial High School for his sophomore and junior year, playing alongside Julian and Justin Champagnie. Nowell averaged 19.9 points and 8.1 assists per game as a junior. He transferred to The Patrick School for his senior season and averaged 10.9 points per game despite missing a month with injuries. He received no Division 1 offers out of high school before getting a look from Little Rock.

College career
As a freshman, Nowell averaged 11.1 points, 4.2 assists, 3.2 rebounds and 1.4 steals per game. He averaged 17.2 points, 4.9 assists, and 3.0 rebounds per game as a sophomore. Nowell was named to the First Team All-Sun Belt. He was suspended for two games in January 2020 due to disciplinary reasons. As a junior, Nowell averaged 14.3 points, 6.0 assists, 3.9 rebounds and 2.3 steals per game but opted out of the season in February 2020. Following the season, he transferred to Kansas State. 

Nowell averaged 12.4 points and team-highs of 5.0 assists and 2.2 steals per game in the 2021–22 season. He was one of two players to return to Kansas State after Jerome Tang was hired as coach to replace Bruce Weber. On January 10, 2023, Nowell was named Oscar Robertson National Player of the Week by the U.S. Basketball Writers Association after scoring a career-high 36 points to go with nine assists and three steals in a 116–103 win against Texas. He was named to the First Team All-Big 12 as well as the All-Defensive Team. During the NCAA tournament, Nowell scored 17 points and recorded a career-high 14 assists during a 77–65 first round win over Montana State.

References

External links
Kansas State Wildcats bio
Little Rock Trojans bio

1999 births
Living people
All-American college men's basketball players
American men's basketball players
Basketball players from New York City
Bishop Loughlin Memorial High School alumni
Kansas State Wildcats men's basketball players
Little Rock Trojans men's basketball players
Point guards
The Patrick School alumni